Andrew Ribeiro (born October 22, 1990) is an American soccer player who plays for National Independent Soccer Association club Chicago House AC.

Prep career
In high school, Ribeiro played four years of varsity soccer at Green Bay's Notre Dame Academy. Boasting a 44–9–4 record during his junior and senior years, Ribeiro lead his team to back to back state titles in 2008 and 2009 while earning First Team All-Conference both years. He was named the Green Bay Press Gazette’s Player of the Year and tabbed second-team all-state as a senior, after totalling 64 points on 26 goals and 12 assists. Ribeiro participated in the Masonic All-Star Game as a senior and had 19 goals, six assists and 44 points as a junior Olympic Development Program Super Y National Team Selection in 2008.

College career
Ribeiro played four years of college soccer at Creighton University between 2009 and 2012. During his time at Creighton, Ribeiro helped lead the Bluejays to two consecutive NCAA College Cup appearances. In addition, he was named NSCAA All-American First Team in 2012 as a senior, as well as the Missouri Valley Conference Defensive Player of the Year.

Professional career
On January 22, 2013 Ribeiro was selected in the fourth round, 70th overall, of the 2013 MLS Supplemental Draft by New York Red Bulls. After being released by New York during the pre-season, Ribeiro was signed by Harrisburg City Islanders and was a regular starter for the club appearing in 24 league matches in his first professional season.

He signed with Chivas USA ahead of the 2014 season but was released a month into the season without making a first team appearance.

Ribeiro signed with USL Pro club Pittsburgh Riverhounds on July 29, 2014.

After five years off from competing professionally, Ribeiro joined Chicago House AC of the National Independent Soccer Association on September 30, 2021.

References

External links
 Creighton bio

1990 births
Living people
American soccer players
Creighton Bluejays men's soccer players
Chicago Fire U-23 players
Portland Timbers U23s players
Penn FC players
Chivas USA players
Pittsburgh Riverhounds SC players
Charlotte Independence players
Orlando City B players
Soccer players from Wisconsin
Sportspeople from Green Bay, Wisconsin
New York Red Bulls draft picks
USL League Two players
USL Championship players
Association football midfielders
All-American men's college soccer players